The 2011–12 Coppa Italia, also known as TIM Cup for sponsorship reasons, was the 65th edition of the competition. As in the previous year, 78 clubs took part in the tournament. Internazionale were the cup holders. Napoli were the winners, thus qualifying for the group stage of the 2012–13 UEFA Europa League.

Participating teams
Serie A (20 teams)

 Atalanta (third round)
 Bologna (round of 16)
 Cagliari (fourth round)
 Catania (fourth round)
 Cesena (round of 16)
 Chievo (quarter-finals)
 Fiorentina (round of 16)
 Genoa (round of 16)
 Internazionale (quarter-finals)
 Juventus (final)
 Lazio (quarter-finals)
 Lecce (third round)
 Milan (semi-finals)
 Napoli (champion)
 Novara (round of 16)
 Palermo (round of 16)
 Parma (fourth round)
 Roma (quarter-finals)
 Siena (semi-finals)
 Udinese (round of 16)

Serie B (22 teams)

 AlbinoLeffe (third round)
 Ascoli (third round)
 Bari (fourth round)
 Brescia (third round)
 Cittadella (third round)
 Crotone (fourth round)
 Empoli (fourth round)
 Grosseto (third round)
 Gubbio (fourth round)
 Juve Stabia (second round)
 Livorno (third round)
 Modena (fourth round)
 Nocerina (third round)
 Padova (third round)
 Pescara (second round)
 Reggina (third round)
 Sampdoria (third round)
 Sassuolo (third round)
 Torino (third round)
 Varese (second round)
 Hellas Verona (round of 16)
 Vicenza (second round)

Lega Pro (27 teams)

 Alessandria (second round)
 Avellino (third round)
 Barletta (first round)
 Benevento (second round)
 Carpi (second round)
 Carrarese (second round)
 Como (first round)
 FeralpiSalò (first round)
 Foggia (second round)
 Frosinone (second round)
 L'Aquila (second round)
 Latina (first round)
 Lumezzane (second round)
 Piacenza (second round)
 Pisa (second round)
 Portogruaro (first round)
 Prato (second round)
 Pro Patria (first round)
 Reggiana (first round)
 Siracusa (second round)
 Sorrento (second round)
 Spezia (second round)
 Taranto (second round)
 Trapani (first round)
 Triestina (third round)
 Tritium (first round)
 Virtus Lanciano (first round)

LND - Serie D (9 teams)

 Bacoli Sibilla (first round)
 Casertana (first round)
 Castel Rigone (second round)
 Pomigliano (first round)
 Pontedera (first round)
 Saint-Christophe (first round)
 Tamai (first round)
 Teramo (first round)
 Voghera (first round)

Format and seeding
Teams enter the competition at various stages, as follows:
 First phase (one-legged fixtures)
 First round: 36 teams from Lega Pro and Serie D start the tournament
 Second round: the 18 winners from the previous round are joined by the 22 Serie B teams
 Third round: the 20 winners from the second round meet the 12 Serie A sides seeded 9-20
 Fourth round: the 16 survivors face each other
 Second phase
 Round of 16 (one-legged): the 8 fourth round winners are inserted into a bracket with the Serie A clubs seeded 1-8
 Quarterfinals (one-legged)
 Semifinals (two-legged)
 Final at the Stadio Olimpico in Rome

Matches

Elimination rounds

Section 1

Match details

First round

Second round

Third round

Fourth round

Section 2

Match details

First round

Second round

Third round

Fourth round

Section 3

Match details

First round

Second round

Third round

Fourth round

Section 4

Match details

First round

Second round

Third round

Fourth round

Section 5

Match details

First round

Second round

Third round

Fourth round

Section 6

Match details

First round

Second round

Third round

Fourth round

Section 7

Match details

First round

Second round

Third round

Fourth round

Section 8

Match details

First round

Second round

Third round

Fourth round

Final stage

Bracket

Round of 16

Quarter-finals

Semi-finals

First leg

Second leg

Final

Top goalscorers

References
General
 
Specific

Coppa Italia seasons
Italy
Coppa Italia